Ale (also known as Gawwada, Gauwada, Gawata, Kawwad'a, Kawwada) is an Afro-Asiatic language spoken in southern Ethiopia. It is a Dullay language. Varieties include Dihina, Gergere, Gollango (= Gaba?), Gorose, Harso; Blench (2006) considers these to be distinct languages.

References

External links
 World Atlas of Language Structures information on Dullay (Gollango)
 Gawwada language topical vocabulary list (from the World Loanword Database)

Languages of Ethiopia
East Cushitic languages